Jim O'Neill is an American science and technology investor and former official at the U.S. Department of Health and Human Services. He was a managing director at Peter Thiel’s Mithril Capital in Silicon Valley. O'Neill was CEO of SENS Research Foundation until his departure in July 2021.

Early life and education
O'Neill attended Yale University from 1986 to 1990, receiving a B.A. in Humanities. He proceeded to the University of Chicago, where he studied from 1996 to 1997, earning an A.M. in Humanities.

Prior to working at Mithril Capital, O'Neill was managing director of Clarium Capital. He founded the Thiel Foundation and Breakout Labs. Prior to Clarium, O'Neill served as the principal associate deputy secretary of health and human services.

Career
O'Neill was Senior Speechwriter at the U.S. Department of Education from March 2001 to December 2002.

From December 2002 to August 2005, he served as Director of the Speech and Editorial Division of the U.S. Department of Health and Human Services, where he wrote or edited all speeches given by the Secretary of Health and Human Services. He was also a member of the United States Delegation to the World Health Assembly.

He was Associate Deputy Secretary/Senior Advisor to the Deputy Secretary of the Department of Health and Human Services from August 2005 to November 2007, then served as Principal Associate Deputy Secretary of the U.S. Department of Health and Human Services from November 2007 to October 2008. In the first-named position, he was involved in policy formulation for various HHS components, including the Administration for Children and Families, the Indian Health Service, the Substance Abuse and Mental Health Services Administration, the Health Resources Services Administration, the Administration on Aging, the Food and Drug Administration, and the Centers for Disease Control and Prevention. In the latter position, he provided advice on policy and programming, helped manage HHS, and was involved in such subsidiary bodies as the Food and Drug Administration, the National Institutes of Health, the Agency for Healthcare Research and Quality, the Office of Public Health and Science, the Biomedical Advanced Research and Development Authority, global health, and the President's Management Agenda. In addition, he served on the President’s Management Council and the Task Force on New Americans.

O'Neill was considered a candidate for the FDA commissioner position and was reportedly favored by Donald Trump's transition team in 2016.

Other professional activities

O'Neill is a co-founder of the Thiel Fellowship, founded in 2010, which gives 24 students a year $100,000 to drop out of school and pursue entrepreneurial interests, and Breakout Labs, founded in 2011, which provides funding to food science and biotech firms. He was CEO of the Thiel Foundation from 2009 to 2012 and was managing director from 2008 to 2012 at Thiel Capital.

He was a board member of the SENS Research Foundation and was appointed CEO of the organization in October 2019, remaining in that position until July 2021. He was also a former board member of the Seasteading Institute.

Views
O'Neill said in a 2014 speech that "We should reform FDA so there is approving drugs after their sponsors have demonstrated safety – and let people start using them, at their own risk, but not much risk of safety....Let’s prove efficacy after they’ve been legalized."

While at HHS, O'Neill opposed FDA regulation of some companies that use mathematical algorithms to perform complex laboratory-developed tests. "In order to regulate in this space, FDA had to argue that an algorithm, a series of numbers that match up to things, is a medical device," he said. "I found that really astonishing – astonishing that someone could say it with a straight face, and astonishing that someone could claim the ability to shut down companies that were never touching a patient but only accurately matching algorithms."

In a 2009 talk, he called for freer markets for a wide range of health-care goods and services. "Basically, because there’s not a free market in health care, people are suffering very significant health consequences that in a free market they would not suffer," he said, adding that a free market in health care "would drive prices much lower and allow innovation in cheaper delivery of care, both in terms of drugs and devices and better forms of delivery."

He is a libertarian and advocate of anti-aging medicine.

References 

Living people
American business executives
Yale University alumni
University of Chicago alumni
Year of birth missing (living people)